Lieutenant General Keith J. Stalder is a retired United States Marine Corps general, who last commanded the United States Marine Corps Forces Pacific from August 22, 2008, to September 2, 2010.

Biography
Keith Stalder was born in Venezuela and grew up in Alaska.  A 1984 graduate of Embry-Riddle Aeronautical University, he holds a master's degree in Aeronautics.  He is also a graduate of Marine Corps Command and Staff College, the Armed Forces Staff College, and the NATO Defense College in Rome, Italy.

He has flown the F-4 Phantom II and the F/A-18 Hornet with  VMFA-333, VMFA-235, VMFA-115, the Navy's VFA-125, VMFA-531 and Marine Aviation Weapons and Tactics Squadron One (MAWTS-1).  He also served at Headquarters, European Command, Stuttgart, Germany as the Operations Division Chief for the military-to-military contact program for Central and Eastern Europe and the former Soviet Union.  He led the Marine Corps' F/A-18 Hornet Introduction Team (HIT) in the early 1980s, commanded VMFA-531 and MAWTS-1 and was the deputy director for Plans and Policy, United States Central Command, during Operation Enduring Freedom.

Stalder also previously served as the Commanding General, 1st Marine Expeditionary Brigade and Deputy Commanding General, I Marine Expeditionary Force, in Operation Iraqi Freedom I. Later, he became the Wing Commander, 3rd Marine Aircraft Wing during a second tour in the Iraq war and

Stalder commanded the Training and Education Command starting in 2005. He relinquished command to MajGen George J. Flynn on July 21, 2006. In 2006, Stalder become Commanding General of the II Marine Expeditionary Force, and relinquished command to LtGen Dennis J. Hejlik on July 25, 2008.

On February 8, 2008, Stalder was nominated for appointment as the commander, U.S. Marine Corps Forces Pacific; commanding general, Fleet Marine Forces Pacific; and commander, Marine Corps Bases Pacific, and for reappointment to the rank of lieutenant general.  He assumed command on August 23, 2008.
He relinquished command and retired on September 2, 2010.

Decorations
His personal decorations include:

Notes

References

Living people
Recipients of the Legion of Merit
United States Marine Corps generals
Recipients of the Navy Distinguished Service Medal
Recipients of the Air Medal
United States Naval Aviators
Recipients of the Defense Superior Service Medal
Year of birth missing (living people)
Recipients of the Meritorious Service Medal (United States)